Billy Parker (born July 19, 1937 in Okemah, Oklahoma) is an American country music disc jockey and singer. Parker was named Disc Jockey of the Year by the Country Music Association in 1974 and by the Academy of Country Music in 1975, 1977, 1978 and 1984. He was inducted into the Country Music Disc Jockey Hall of Fame in 1992, the Western Swing Hall of Fame in 1993, and received the Oklahoma Association of Broadcasters' Lifetime Achievement Award in 1995.

Between 1976 and 1989, Parker charted more than twenty singles on the Billboard Hot Country Singles & Tracks chart. His highest charting single, "(Who's Gonna Sing) The Last Country Song," peaked at No. 41 in 1982. He also reached the Top 10 on the RPM Country Tracks chart in Canada with the song "You Are My Angel" in 1988.

Discography

Albums

Singles

References

External links
[ Billy Parker] at Allmusic
 Voices of Oklahoma interview. First person interview conducted on April 16, 2012 with Billy Parker.

1939 births
Living people
People from Okemah, Oklahoma
American country singer-songwriters
American radio DJs
American male singer-songwriters
Singer-songwriters from Oklahoma
Country musicians from Oklahoma